Li Chengyun (born May 1955) is a former Chinese politician who served as Vice-Governor of Sichuan from 2008 to 2011. He was convicted of corruption in 2017 (as part of an anti-corruption campaign under Xi Jinping) and sentenced to ten years in prison.

Career
Li was born in Guang'an, Sichuan, China. He graduated from University of Shanghai for Science and Technology and joined the workforce in March 1974. Li was the director of Sichuan Machinery Industry Department and Chinese Communist Party Secretary of Deyang. In 2006, he became the director of Sichuan State Assets Committee. Li was promoted to the Vice-Governor of Sichuan in January 2008 and was dismissed in September 2011 for "serious violations of regulations". After two months, he was released and became the Deputy Director of Sichuan Decision Advisory Committee.

On April 9, 2016, Li was placed under investigation by the Central Commission for Discipline Inspection, the party's internal disciplinary body, for "serious violations of regulations". He was expelled from the Communist Party on July 26. On May 31, 2017, Li was sentenced to ten years in prison for taking bribes worth over 6.36 million yuan (US$958,000) by the Intermediate People's Court of Liupanshui. According to official Chinese media, one of Li's mistresses was a spy for two foreign countries.

References

1955 births
Living people
Chinese Communist Party politicians from Sichuan
People's Republic of China politicians from Sichuan
Political office-holders in Sichuan
Politicians from Guang'an
Expelled members of the Chinese Communist Party
Chinese politicians convicted of corruption
University of Shanghai for Science and Technology alumni